The Dream Lady is a 1918 American silent drama film directed by Elsie Jane Wilson and starring Carmel Myers. It was produced by Bluebird Photoplays and distributed by Universal Film Manufacturing Company.

Cast

Preservation
The film is preserved in a European film archive, the French archive Centre national du cinéma et de l'image animée in Fort de Bois-d'Arcy.

References

External links

Lobby poster

1918 films
American silent feature films
American black-and-white films
Universal Pictures films
Silent American drama films
1918 drama films
1910s American films